The Win-Win Memorial is a monument that marks the end of civil wars in Cambodia. It was inaugurated on 31 December 2018 by Prime Minister Hun Sen to mark the end of the civil war 20 years ago. The monument stands on a 8 hectare plaza with eight pools, various sculptures, and the base is 117 meters featuring bas-reliefs depicting the journey to peace. It cost $12 million and was designed in a modernist Khmer style architecture.

References

Buildings and structures in Phnom Penh
Buildings and structures completed in 2018